Aethiopina is a genus of moths in the family Cossidae.

Species
 Aethiopina argentifera Gaede, 1929
 Aethiopina semicirculata Gaede, 1929

References

External links

Natural History Museum Lepidoptera generic names catalog

Metarbelinae